Ajay Gopikisan Piramal (born 3 August 1955) is an Indian billionaire businessman, and the chairman of the Piramal Group, a conglomerate with interests in pharmaceutical, financial services, real estate, healthcare analytics and glass packaging. As of September 2022, his net worth was estimated at US$3 billion.

Early life  
Ajay Piramal was born to Gopikisan Piramal and Lalita Piramal in Rajasthan, India on 3 August 1955. In 1977, at age 22, Piramal started out in his family's textile business, founded in 1934 by his grandfather Piramal Chatrabhuj. His father, Gopikisan Piramal, died in 1979, and after five years he lost an older brother to cancer, prompting him to take over the business.

Piramal holds a bachelor's degree in Science from the Jai Hind College and Basantsingh Institute of Science, University of Mumbai (then Bombay), a master's degree in management studies from Jamnalal Bajaj Institute of Management Studies, University of Mumbai, and in 1992 attended the six-week Advanced Management Programme at Harvard Business School. Piramal has received an honorary doctorate by Amity University, India and Honorary Doctor of Science from IIT Indore.

Business career 
In 1988, Piramal bought Nicholas Laboratories, an Australian multinational corporation. The company is now ranked fifth among pharma companies in India, having made a string of overseas acquisitions like the Indian subsidiaries of Roche, Boehringer Mannheim, Rhone Poulenc, ICI and Hoechst Research Centre. India's first major shopping mall, Crossroads, was developed from three redundant Piramal factory buildings in Mumbai.

He led Piramal Enterprises Ltd invested in Vodafone India by buying 11% in two tranches. The first 5.5%, was bought in 2011 for Rs 2,856 crore and the second, the next year for Rs 3,007 crore to buy a 5.5% stake in Vodafone India for INR 30.07 billion ($618 million), taking the total stake to 11%. In April 2014, Piramal Enterprises Ltd. sold its 11% stake for INR 8,900 crore, at a 51.78% premium to the price the company had paid in 2011–12.

After selling his stake in Vodafone India, Piramal paid INR 2,014 crore to buy a 20% stake in Shriram Capital Ltd., an arm of the Chennai-based Shriram Group. The purchase was made in addition to INR 1,636 crore investment in Shriram Transport Finance Co. Ltd. for a 9.9% stake. Piramal also serves as the Chairman of Shriram Group.

Piramal announced in 2019 he planned to resign as chairman of Shriram Capital Ltd. He was named chairman five years earlier.

Directorships and board memberships 

 Chairman, Piramal Group
Non-Executive Director, Tata Sons Ltd
Member, Board of Dean's Advisors, Harvard Business School
Board of Advisors, India's International Movement to Unite Nations
President and Chairman of the Governing Body, Anant National University
Chairman, Pratham Education Foundation
Member of National Council of Confederation of the Indian Industry (CII)
Co-Chair, UK-India CEO Forum
Member of the Honorable Prime Minister's Council for Trade & Industry and the Board of Trade constituted by the Ministry of Commerce
Member of the Honorable Prime Minister's Task Force on Pharmaceuticals and Knowledge-Based Industries
Member, Central Board of State Bank of India
Invitee to the World Economic Forum for the last 20 years

Former positions

 Former Chairman, Indian Institute of Technology, Indore
 Member, Central board of directors of State Bank of India.

Awards and honours 

 Honorary Commander of the Order of the British Empire (CBE) in 2022 for services to the UK-India trade relationship.
 Business Leader of the Year Award, 2018, International Advertising Association Leadership Awards
 Special Achievement Award, Asia Pacific Entrepreneurship Awards (APEA) 2018
 CNBC Asia's India Business Leader of the Year Award, 2018
 CNBC Asia Business Leader of the Year Award, 2017
 Corporate Citizen of the Year award by AIMA Managing India Awards in 2016
 SEN Sustainability Award – Philanthropy and Best of Best – instituted by World Presidents' Organisation (2015)
 Business Leader of the Year 2015, by Indo-American Chamber of Commerce
 Outstanding Philanthropist 2013 and 2014, Forbes Philanthropy Awards
 Kriyasheel Global Achievers Award (2010)
 India Innovator of the Year 2008 awarded by CNBC TV 18
 Entrepreneur of the Year' Award of UK Trade and Investment Council in 2006
 Ernst & Young's Entrepreneur of the Year Award in the Healthcare and Life Sciences category in 2004
 "Business Leader Award" in Pharma Sector at the CHEMTECH PHARMABIO AWARD (2004);
 "Life Time Achievement Award" by The Rotary Club of Mumbai Mid-Town (2004)
 Global Leader of Tomorrow by the World Economic Forum (2004)
 Rotary International (District 3140) Certificate of Appreciation and "Four Way Test Award" in 2001
 CEO of the Year Award' by World Strategy Forum (1999)

Philanthropy 
Piramal finances the Piramal Foundation. The foundation is quoted as taking about 10–15% of his time. The Piramal Foundation is the philanthropic arm of the Piramal Group.

The Piramal Foundation has initiatives across Health, Education and Safe Drinking Water, namely Piramal Swasthya, Piramal Foundation for Education Leadership and Piramal Sarvajal, respectively. The Foundation works across 21 states in India, mostly in partnership with state governments.

Piramal is among the Advisory Committee Members of Annamrita, ISKCON Food Relief Foundation (IFRF) that serves 1.2 million meals through its 20 kitchens across India every day.

Gulita 

A wedding gift from Anand Piramal’s parents, Ajay and Swati Piramal to their bride Isha Piramal,  their home Gulita is sprawled across 5,00,000 square feet of floor space in Mumbai’s ultra-premium Worli area and holds three basements, multiple dining rooms, an outdoor swimming pool, a garden, as well as a huge hall.  The ground floor features an exquisite entrance lobby leading to a dining hall, a master bedroom, and more. The diamond-themed bungalow also has a diamond room and a temple room.  Facing the Arabian Sea, the swanky mansion also offers a clear view of the Bandra Worli sea-link. Estimated to be worth $100 million today, Gulita was bought through an auction by Piramal from Hindustan Unilever for $61.2 million in 2012. Ajay Piramal and his family started the remodeling work for the house in 2015.  Following the completion of the renovation work, the Brihanmumbai Municipal Corporation (BMC) gave an occupancy certificate to the grand property in September 2018. The interior is designed just as of Antilia, the residence of Isha Ambani before marriage, which was also the second most luxurious and expensive house.

Personal life

Ajay Piramal is married to Swati Shah Piramal. They are the parents of two children. Their daughter, Nandini Piramal D'Young, married US citizen Peter D'Young in 2009. Piramal's son, Anand Piramal, married Isha Ambani Piramal (née Ambani), daughter of billionaire businessman Mukesh Dhirubhai Ambani and his wife Nita Dalal Ambani, on 12 December 2018.

The family considers Radhanath Swami their family-guru.

References

Living people
Indian businesspeople in the pharmaceutical industry
Businesspeople from Mumbai
Jamnalal Bajaj Institute of Management Studies alumni
Rajasthani people
1955 births
Jai Hind College alumni
University of Mumbai alumni
Indian billionaires
Piramal Group
Honorary Commanders of the Order of the British Empire